Patrick Holmes (born March 30, 1966) is an Irish sprint canoer who competed in the late 1980s and early 1990s. At the 1988 Summer Olympics in Seoul, he was eliminated in the semifinals of both the K-1 1000 m and K-2 500 m events. Four years later in Barcelona, Holmes was eliminated in the semifinals of both the K-1 500 m and the K-1 1000 m events.

References
Sports-Reference.com profile

1966 births
Canoeists at the 1988 Summer Olympics
Canoeists at the 1992 Summer Olympics
Irish male canoeists
Living people
Olympic canoeists of Ireland